G-Unit Books was an American book publishing imprint started by rapper 50 Cent in partnership with MTV/Pocketbooks on January 4, 2007, following a prior relationship with the company dating back to the publication of his memoir in 2005. He launched  G-Unit Books at the Time Warner Building in New York. 

In addition to his memoir, 50 also co-wrote The Ski Mask Way, a novel about a small-time drug dealer who attempts to rob his employers.  All G-Unit books were meant to be street fiction encouraging reading at a younger age.

G-Unit Books released its last books in 2011.

Bibliography
From Pieces To Weight : Once Upon A Time In Southside Queens (Release Date : August 15, 2006)
Baby Brother (Release Date : January 9, 2007)
Death Before Dishonor (Release Date : January 9, 2007)
The Ski Mask Way (Release Date : January 9, 2007)
Blow (Release Date : July 12, 2007)
Derelict (Release Date : July 12, 2007)
Harlem Heat (Release Date : July 24, 2007)
Heaven's Fury (Release Date : November 20, 2007)
The Diamond District (Release Date : March 25, 2008)
Tia's Diary : Deeper Than Rap (Release Date : May 25, 2009)
The 50th Law (Released : September 8, 2009)
Playground (Released : November 1, 2011)

References

2007 establishments in New York City
50 Cent
G-Unit
American companies established in 2007
Book publishing companies based in New York (state)
Book publishing company imprints
Publishing companies established in 2007